Neurachne, commonly called mulga grass, is a genus of Australian plants in the grass family.

The 1889 book 'The Useful Native Plants of Australia’ records that Neurachne Munroi is "a very rare grass, peculiar to the back country, and only found amongst Mulga scrubs (Acacia aneura and allied species)." Found in the Interior of South Australia, Victoria, and New South Wales.

 Species

 formerly included
see Isachne Panicum Paraneurachne Sacciolepis Thyridolepis Zygochloa

References

Panicoideae
Poaceae genera
Endemic flora of Australia